Medipolis SC Jena is a basketball club based in Jena, Germany that plays in the ProA. Their home court is the Sparkassen Arena, which seats 3,000. Their current head coach is Dominik Reinboth.

The team was known as Erdgas Baskets Jena through the 2006 season, then as POM Baskets Jena, then Science City Jena in 2007. In the 2015–16 season, they won their first ProA title and promoted to the Bundesliga.

History
Although never a big sport in the former East Germany, basketball was played in Jena since the 1960s. In 1994, a new basketball program was found in the "Turn- und Sportverein (TuS) Jena". Starting in the lower divisions the club gained promotion to the second division (2. Liga Süd) in 2001. Once established in professional sports the club started to become a basketball only organization with the founding of the Baskets Jena GmbH which now holds the license.

The biggest success so far has been the promotion to the 1st division (BBL) in 2007. The stay in the top league lasted only one year with the club finishing last after an eventful year. With the promotion, the team switched to the bigger "JenArena" which allowed attendances up to 3.000 in a temporary construction. Financial difficulties in maintaining the "JenArena" led to a return to the gym "Werner-Seelenbinder-Halle".

In the 2015–16 season, Jena won the ProA championship by beating SC Rasta Vechta in the Finals and was promoted back to the Bundesliga.

In 2021, the team changed its name from Science City Jena to Medipolis SC Jena.

Honours
ProA
Champions: 2015–16

Season by season

Players

Current roster

Notable players

 Johannes Voigtmann
 Mark Davis
 Julius Jenkins
 Immanuel McElroy
 Kyle Weaver
 Ike Iroegbu

References

External links

Basketball teams established in 1994
Basketball teams in Germany
Sport in Jena